Elvran is a village in the municipality of Stjørdal in Trøndelag county, Norway. The village is the location of Elvran Church.

Notable residents
Jan Reinås (1944–2010), a Norwegian businessman
Elvran Chapel

References

Villages in Trøndelag
Stjørdal